Hong Kong Elite Youth League was a Hong Kong youth football league established in 2004.

Competition format
 Each team plays the other teams once.
 If two or more clubs obtained equal points, their place shall be determined as follows:
1. Greater number of points obtained in the league matches between the clubs concerned.
2. Goal difference resulting from the league matches between the clubs concerned.
3. Greater number of goals scored in the group matches between the clubs concerned.

Winners

 
Youth